Volovo is an urban locality (an urban-type settlement) in Volovsky District of Tula Oblast, Russia. Population:

References

Urban-type settlements in Tula Oblast
Volovsky District, Tula Oblast